Trosch can refer to:

David Trosch (1935–2012), American clergyman and author
Gene Trosch (born 1945), American football player 
Wilbur Trosch (1938–2014), American basketball player and coach